Toula may refer to:
 Toula, Batroun a village in the district (Qada') of Batroun in Lebanon
 Toula, Burkina Faso
 Toula, Zgharta, a village in the district (Qada') of Zgharta in Lebanon
 Toula (Vava'u), a village on the main island of Vavau in the kingdom of Tonga
 Tula, Russia, an industrial city in Russia
 Toula Grivas (born 1943)
 Toula Portokalos, a character in the film My Big Fat Greek Wedding
 Toula, a character from the Australian TV series Pizza